Nys is a surname. Notable people with the surname include:

 Hugo Nys (born 1991), French tennis player
 Jef Nys (1927–2009), Belgian comic book artist
 Patrick Nys (born 1969), Belgian soccer goalkeeper
 Pieter Nys (born 1989), Belgian soccer player
 Sven Nys (born 1976), Belgian cyclist

See also
 NYS (disambiguation)